Giorgos Pantziaras (born August 20, 1952) is a Cypriot former international football goalkeeper.

He played for APOEL Nicosia (1971-1978 & 1985-1987), for Aris (1978–1984) and Apollon Limassol (1987–1989).

He also served as head coach of Aris (2002) and in various other capacities in football for Aris as well as, more recently, for Apollon Kalamaria.

External links
 
 

1952 births
Living people
Cypriot footballers
Cyprus international footballers
APOEL FC players
Aris Thessaloniki F.C. players
Apollon Limassol FC players
Greek Cypriot people
Association football goalkeepers
Cypriot football managers
Aris Thessaloniki F.C. managers
Expatriate football managers in Greece
Cypriot expatriate sportspeople in Greece
Cypriot expatriate footballers
Cypriot expatriate football managers
Super League Greece managers
Sportspeople from Nicosia